In mathematical logic and graph theory, an implication graph is a skew-symmetric, directed graph  composed of vertex set  and directed edge set . Each vertex in  represents the truth status of a Boolean literal, and each directed edge from vertex  to vertex  represents the material implication "If the literal  is true then the literal  is also true". Implication graphs were originally used for analyzing complex Boolean expressions.

Applications
A 2-satisfiability instance in conjunctive normal form can be transformed into an implication graph by replacing each of its disjunctions by a pair of implications. For example, the statement  can be rewritten as the pair . An instance is satisfiable if and only if no literal and its negation belong to the same strongly connected component of its implication graph; this characterization can be used to solve 2-satisfiability instances in linear time.

In CDCL SAT-solvers, unit propagation can be naturally associated with an implication graph that captures all possible ways of deriving all implied literals from decision literals, which is then used for clause learning.

References

Boolean algebra
Application-specific graphs
Directed graphs
Graph families